The electricity sectors of the Republic of Ireland and Northern Ireland are integrated and supply 2.5 million customers from a combination of coal, peat, natural gas, wind and hydropower. In 2018 natural gas produced 51.8%, while wind turbines generated 28.1%, coal 7%, and peat 6.8% of Ireland's average electricity demand. In 2020 wind turbines generated 36.3% of Ireland's electrical demand, one of the highest wind power proportions in the world. While the United Kingdom was one of the first countries in the world to deploy commercial nuclear power plants, the island of Ireland has never had a nuclear power plant built on either side of the Irish border. Nuclear power in Ireland was discussed in the 1960s and 1970s but ultimately never phased in, with legislation now in place explicitly forbidding its introduction.

The grid runs as a synchronous electrical grid and in terms of interconnections has undersea DC-only connections to the UK National Grid, alongside plans in the advanced stage for a higher power, planned Celtic Interconnector to France. In the 2019 UK General Election 2019, the Democratic Unionist Party included in their manifesto a proposal to link Iceland to Northern Ireland (a variant on Icelink).

The EU forced the irish government to increase electricity prices in ireland in the 80's or could have been early 90's to attract competition to the irish market. After price increases failed to bring in competition for the ESB, the irish government set up a company called Virtual Irish Power. The ESB then sold power to VIP at a loss so VIP could sell at a profit, creating a false competition. Keep in mind there hadn't been an increase in electricity prices for 15 years up to this point.

Island system

The electricity sector in Ireland previously operated as two separate markets: Northern Ireland operated as part of the UK, and the Republic of Ireland operated its own separate market. On 1 November 2007 the two Transmission System Operators (System Operator Northern Ireland and EirGrid) established the Single Electricity Market for the island of Ireland. This market has created "a gross mandatory pool market, into which all electricity generated on or imported onto the island of Ireland must be sold, and from which all wholesale electricity for consumption on or export from the island of Ireland must be purchased".  According to the Electricity Association of Ireland, in 2013 the Single Electricity Market had approximately 2.5 million customers; 1.8 million in the Republic and 0.7 million in Northern Ireland. The effect of Brexit on the Single Electricity Market has yet to be defined.

Ireland and Northern Ireland form a regional group of the Europe-wide ENTSO-E organisation. The networks are not yet interconnected with the Continental Europe grid, but have interconnection with the British network through the Moyle Interconnector and the East–West Interconnector. In 2014, the island had an electricity interconnection level (international transmission capacity relative to production capacity) of 9%, below the recommended 10% level.

Electricity in the Republic of Ireland

Electricity generators in the Republic of Ireland are ESB, Airtricity, Synergen (70% ESB), Edenderry Power, Endesa-Ireland and Huntstown (Viridian). ESB owns the transmission and distribution networks.

The transmission system operator is EirGrid plc, which assumed the role from ESB Networks on 1 July 2006. EirGrid ensures the safe, secure and economic operation of the high voltage electricity grid. EirGrid is owned by the Irish State and is established as a result of a government decision to create an independent organisation to carry out the transmission system operator function, in order to assist the liberalisation of Ireland's electricity industry and the development of a competitive market.

The electricity industry is regulated by the Commission for Regulation of Utilities which also regulates the natural gas market. The functions and duties of the commission have been altered and expanded significantly by legislation transposing EU directives into Irish law.

Renewable energy

Wind energy

Electricity Grid 
The high-voltage Irish electricity transmission grid comprises 6,800 km of power lines and operates at 400 kV, 220 kV and 110 kV. Substations provide entry points to, and exits from, the transmission grid.  Entry points include thermal and hydro-electric power stations, major wind farms, and inter-connectors from other countries and regions. Exit points are to lower voltage (220 kV, 110 kV, and 38 kV) transmission and distribution substations.

EirGrid is the Transmission System Operator (TSO), and ESB Networks is the Transmission Asset Owner (TAO).

There are two 400 kV lines. One is from Moneypoint power station to Woodland substation where there is a connection to the 400 kV DC East-West Interconnector. The Oldstreet 400 V substation is an intermediate substation on this line. The second line is from Moneypoint power station to Dunstown 400 kV substation.

There are 220 kV substations at:

Aghada power station, Arklow, Arva, Ballyvouskill, Ballynahulla, Belcamp, Carrickmines, Cashla, Clashavoon, Clonee, Corduff, Cowcross, Cullenagh, Dunstown, Finglas, Flagford, Glanagow power station, Gorman, Great Island power station, Huntstown power station, Kellistown, Kilpaddoge, Killonan, Knockraha, Killonan, Lodgewood, Louth (and a connection to the 275 kV Northern Ireland grid), Maynooth, Moneypoint power station, Prospect, Raffee, Shannonbridge, Srananagh, Tarbert power station, Turlough Hill, and West Dublin.

Ireland has several grid energy storage facilities with a combined 650 MW power, of which some are bidding into Ireland's DS3 grid services market for frequency control.

Approved projects:

Electricity in Northern Ireland

There are three power stations in Northern Ireland: Ballylumford power station, Coolkeeragh power station and Kilroot power station. Northern Ireland Electricity (a subsidiary of ESB Group) owns the transmission and distribution networks.

The single electricity market means that Northern Ireland Electricity carries electricity on its network in exchange for a regulated charge to the electricity supply company. As of September 2011 domestic customers in Northern Ireland are able to buy electricity from Electric Ireland, Power NI, Airtricity, Click Energy or Budget Energy. Industrial and commercial customers are able to choose from several other electricity suppliers.

The transmission system operator is System Operator Northern Ireland, which ensures the safe, secure and economic operation of the high voltage electricity grid. Its counterpart in the Republic of Ireland is EirGrid. Both of these are owned by EirGrid plc which also (through a joint partnership) acts as the single energy market operator, i.e., runs the new all-island wholesale market for electricity.

Electricity Regulation 
The electricity industry in Northern Ireland is regulated by the Northern Ireland Authority for Utility Regulation. The authority is an independent public body established to oversee and regulate the electricity, gas, water and sewerage industries in Northern Ireland. The Authority is a non-ministerial government department responsible for promoting the short and long term interests of consumers. It does not make policy, but ensures that the energy and water utility industries are regulated and developed within ministerial policies. It is governed by a Board of Directors and is accountable to the Northern Ireland Assembly.

History 
The office of Director General of Electricity Supply for Northern Ireland was established in 1992 in association with the privatisation of electricity supplies in Northern Ireland. The Director General was appointed by the Department of Economic Development to regulate the electricity industry. Statutory duties included ensuring that all reasonable demands for electricity were satisfied; that licence holders were able to finance their activities; to promote competition in the generation and supply of electricity; to protect the interests of consumers of electricity in terms of price and continuity of supply; to promote efficiency and economy; to promote research and development; to protect the public from danger; and to secure the health and safety of persons employed in the generation, transmission or supply of electricity.

The regulatory system was reformed in 2003 to combine the regulation of electricity and natural gas into a single energy regulator. The Northern Ireland Authority for Energy Regulation was established and the offices of Director General of Gas for Northern Ireland and Director General of Electricity Supply for Northern Ireland were abolished. The posts of Chief Executive and Chair of the Energy Regulator were split in 2006.

In April 2007 the regulatory system for utilities was further reformed to encompass the water supply and sewage industries. The Northern Ireland Authority for Energy Regulation became the Northern Ireland Authority for Utility Regulation. The board of directors is responsible for the overall strategic direction of the organisation. The board comprises a non-executive chairman, four non-executive members and the chief executive. The key functional areas in the organisation are Network Operations, Wholesale, Retail and Consumer Protection, and Corporate Affairs.

Key people 
Director General of Electricity Supply

 Geoffrey Horton, 1992–1995
 Douglas Bowman McIldoon (b. 1945), 1995–2003. Was also Director General of Gas Supply.

Chair and Chief Executive of Energy Regulation

 Douglas Bowman McIldoon, 2003–June 2006.

Chief Executive of Energy Regulation

 Iain Osborne, June 2006 – 2007

Chief Executive of Northern Ireland Authority for Utility Regulation

 Iain Osborne, 2007–December 2010
 Shane Lynch, January 2011–October 2013
 Jenny Pyper, October 2013–Autumn 2020

Chair of Northern Ireland Authority for Utility Regulation

 Professor Peter Matthews, 2006–July 2012
 Dr Bill Emery, July 2012–date (2020)

See also
 List of power stations in the Republic of Ireland
 Renewable energy in the Republic of Ireland
 Energy law

References

External links
EAI: Electricity Association of Ireland
Single Electricity Market Operator for the Island of Ireland
Island of Ireland Electricity Regulation
Commission for Energy Regulation
Northern Ireland Authority for Energy Regulation
Republic of Ireland Transmission Network Operator
System Operator for Northern Ireland (SONI)
Republic of Ireland Electricity Suppliers
Northern Ireland Electricity Suppliers
Transmission map